Roëllecourt is a commune in the Pas-de-Calais department in the Hauts-de-France region of France.

Geography

Population

Places of interest
 The sixteenth-century church of St.Omer.
 An eighteenth-century manor house
 A chapel.
 Traces of an old castle.

See also
 Communes of the Pas-de-Calais department

References

Communes of Pas-de-Calais